Heteroacanthella is a genus of fungi in the order Auriculariales. Basidiocarps (fruit bodies) are corticioid (effused, patch-forming) with smooth surfaces and occur on dead, attached wood or on lichens. They are microscopically distinctive in having acanthoid (spiny) basidia with just one or two large sterigmata producing large, globose to ellipsoid basidiospores. The genus occurs worldwide, though individual species may be localized. Three species have been described to date.

References

Auriculariales
Basidiomycota genera
Taxa described in 1990
Taxa named by Franz Oberwinkler